Read It and Weep is a 2006 Disney Channel Original Movie which premiered on July 21, 2006. It is based on the novel How My Private, Personal Journal Became A Bestseller by Julia DeVillers. Sisters Kay and Danielle Panabaker star as Jamie Bartlett and her alter ego Isabella (Iz or Is), respectively. Both sisters have starred in previous Disney Channel films: Kay in Life Is Ruff (2005), and Danielle in Stuck in the Suburbs (2004); like Read It and Weep, those films also premiered in July in their respective years.

Plot
Freshman Jameson "Jamie" Bartlett has three best friends named Connor (who has a crush on her), Lindsay, and Harmony, a brother named Lenny Bartlett, and a mean enemy named Sawyer Sullivan, whose boyfriend Marco Vega is the object of Jamie's affection. She also owns a tablet PC, on which she keeps a journal she writes in every day. In the journal, she writes about a character named "Isabella" or "Is", a popular girl with incredible powers who stands up to a mean girl named Myrna. In actuality, the journal is a more imaginative version of Jamie's life, with Is being loosely based on Jamie and Myrna being based on Sawyer.

For an English assignment, Jamie has to write an essay of her choice. Her printer dies, and Lenny refuses to let her use his. Lindsay offers to print the essay if Jamie emails it to her, but she accidentally sends her the journal. After Lindsay turns the journal in for Jamie, it wins a writing contest and is published as a book. Jamie's book attracts a lot of publicity, eventually becoming a bestseller. She appears at many book signings, on reality TV shows, is often interviewed, and meets stars whom she has always wanted to meet. Soon, success gets the better of Jamie; she becomes increasingly materialistic and critical of the world around her, quitting her job at her father's pizza place, ridiculing Lenny's guitar playing, and favoring fame over her friends. Her newfound popularity is dashed during a television interview where she inadvertently reveals that the antagonist of her novel is based on Sawyer and all of her other life dramas.

As Jamie's classmates learn that the book was based on Jamie's negative feelings toward her school, she wishes to restore her relationships. However, her friends are unwilling to trust her again and begin to reject and avoid her. To make up for her mistakes, she apologizes to Lenny, encouraging him to take up his guitar playing once more, despite what she'd said. Jamie overhears her parents' conversation about having to close down the pizza parlor, and Jamie feels guilty.

As she is getting ready for the ocean-themed school dance, Jamie confronts Is, a figment of her imagination who tries to make Jamie like she is, and tells her to stop. She then goes to the dance, where she tries to apologize to everyone. They do not accept her apology at first, but gradually do after learning the book was really Jamie's personal journal and that she never meant for it to be published. Jamie finds Connor just as he is leaving. She asks for his forgiveness and finds out that the poems Marco submits in their English class were actually written by Connor. Jamie realizes that her crush on Marco, which is largely because of the poems, is actually meant for Connor. They walk back into the dance, where Lenny performs a song ("I Will Be Around") dedicated to Jamie.

After the dance, Jamie invites everyone to eat at her parents' pizza parlor. When Lenny rushes into the kitchen to help cook the pizza, his jacket, which was covered in seaweed from the dance, accidentally lands on some of the pizzas, covering them in seaweed. When the pizza is delivered to the customers, they love it, and Jamie's father finally figures out the secret of how to save their business, ending the film on a happy note.

Cast
 Kay Panabaker as Jamison "Jamie" Bartlett
 Danielle Panabaker as Isabella "IS"
 Alexandra Krosney as Harmony
 Marquise C. Brown as Lindsay
 Allison Scagliotti as Sawyer "Myrna" Sullivan
 Jason Dolley as Connor Kennedy
 Chad Broskey as Marco Vega
 Tom Virtue as Ralph Bartlett
 Connie Young as Peggy Bartlett
 Robin Riker as Diana
 Nick Whitaker as Lenny Bartlett
 Falisha Fehoko as Jennifer #1
 Malinda Money as Jennifer #2
 Joyce Cohen as Miss Gallagher
 Paisley Van Patten as Amber Tiffany

Production
The movie was based on the book How My Private, Personal Journal Became a Bestseller. Julia DeVillers, the author of the book from which the movie was made, has a cameo in a pizza parlor scene. There are a number of differences between the book and the film.

Read It and Weep was filmed at Murray High School and Downtown Salt Lake City. Murray High School was also the set of: Take Down (1978), the auditorium scene of High School Musical (2006), Minutemen (2008) and High School Musical: Get in the Picture (2008).

References

External links
 Read It and Weep at Ultimate Disney
 

2006 television films
2006 films
2006 comedy-drama films
2000s teen comedy-drama films
American teen comedy-drama films
American comedy-drama television films
Disney Channel Original Movie films
Films about writers
Films based on American novels
Films directed by Paul Hoen
Films shot in Utah
2000s English-language films
2000s American films